Holttumochloa magica is a species of bamboos native to the hill forests of Pahang in Peninsular Malaysia. It is the type species of its genus.

References

Bambusoideae
Flora of Peninsular Malaysia
Plants described in 1993